Roxanne Martin / Bezhik Anungo Kwe (One Star Woman) is an Anishinaabe artist, educator, author, jingle-dress dancer, LGTBQA2+ activist and small-business entrepreneur. She is the niece and goddaughter of artist Cecil Youngfox. Roxanne is from Wiikwemkoong First Nation  and Serpent River First Nation, she is of the Eagle clan.

Career 
Martin was educated in Theatre Arts Production at Cambrian College in Sudbury, Ontario. She holds a BFA from Algoma University and a B.Ed. from the Schulich School of Education at Nipissing University.

She has been heavily involved in Ojibwa language preservation through her series of children's books Baby WayNa made for infants to the age of five.

Beginning in 2015 Martin began working with the Teach for Canada program, she currently has taught kindergarten to grade 6 in Lac Seul, Eagle Lake and Wabigoon First Nations.

Work

Exhibitions 
 'Maamaandaawinam,' "She has a vision", at 180 Projects Gallery in Sault Ste. Marie, March 28 – 31, 2013
 Youth Solidarity Exhibition, Art Gallery of Ontario, June 22 - November 15, 2014

Awards and nominations 
 Michaelle Jean Foundation Youth Solidarity Award Recipient 2014

References

External links 
 Roxanne Martin's web page
 Baby WayNa Books Page

Created via preloaddraft
Canadian illustrators
Canadian women artists
Algoma University alumni
First Nations artists
Living people
People from Manitoulin Island
Year of birth missing (living people)